Frances Anne Hughes Glendening (born 1951) is a former First Lady of Maryland.  She was married to former Maryland Governor Parris Glendening, whom she divorced while he was governor.

As first lady, Glendening did much toward promoting the history of the state's accomplished women, and opening Maryland's official gubernatorial home, Government House, to the public.

Glendening's official portrait, painted by Aaron Shikler, was unveiled on June 24, 2004.

References

Living people
First Ladies and Gentlemen of Maryland
University of Maryland, College Park alumni
Columbus School of Law alumni
Women in Maryland politics
1951 births
People from University Park, Maryland
21st-century American women